Vetiver is a species of tropical grass, Chrysopogon zizanioides, native to India.

Vetiver may also refer to:
Vétiver, a men's fragrance produced by Guerlain
Vetiver (band), an American folk band

Vetiver (album), their debut album
 Vetiver System, a system of soil and water conservation